Wendy J. Schiller is the Royce Family Professor of Teaching Excellence in Political Science at Brown University. She is a Faculty Fellow at Brown's Watson Institute for International and Public Affairs, where she also serves as Director of the A. Alfred Taubman Center for American Politics and Policy.

Schiller received an undergraduate degree from the University of Chicago and completed her M.A and Ph.D. at the University of Rochester.

Books 
 
 
  with Burdett A. Loomis
  with Charles Stewart III
  with Burdett A. Loomis

References 

University of Chicago alumni

University of Rochester alumni
Brown University faculty
American women political scientists
American political scientists
American women academics
Living people

Year of birth missing (living people)